Eminence Junior-Senior High School is a public high school located in Eminence, Indiana.

See also
 List of high schools in Indiana

References

External links
 Official Website
Buildings and structures in Morgan County, Indiana